Coconut bar is a refrigerated dim sum dessert found in Hong Kong, Taiwan, Southern China and in overseas Chinatowns. It is sweet and has a soft, gelatin-like texture but is white in color rather than translucent like gelatin. It is sometimes referred to as coconut pudding.

Preparation
The dessert is made of coconut milk (preferably freshly made) and set with a mixture of tang flour (wheat starch) and corn starch, or a mixture of agar agar and gelatin. It is sweetened, and sometimes sprinkled with desiccated coconuts. The texture varies from silky springy (if gelatin and agar agar is used as setting agent) to creamy in texture (if wheat starch and corn starch are used to set the dessert) depending on individual preparations. The standard dim sum version has no filling.

See also
 Haupia
 Jell-O
 Maja blanca
 Mango pudding
 Tembleque
 List of Chinese desserts
 List of desserts

References

Cantonese cuisine
Chinese desserts
Dim sum
Foods containing coconut
Hong Kong desserts
Taiwanese desserts
Jams and jellies